Randal Willars Valdez (born 30 April 2002) is a Mexican diver.

Competitive history 
Willars competed in the 2018 Summer Youth Olympics, where he won the gold medal in the men's individual 10m platform event. He finished 5th in the 3-m springboard event. 

At the 2021 FINA Diving World Cup Willars won the silver medal in the 10m platform event. Together with Iván García he won the silver medal in the Men's synchronised 10m platform event as well.

References

External links 
 Randal Willars at FINA 

2002 births
Mexican male divers
Divers at the 2018 Summer Youth Olympics
Youth Olympic gold medalists for Mexico
Living people
21st-century Mexican people